Chinellato is an Italian surname. Notable people with the surname include:

 Giacomo Chinellato (born 1955), Italian footballer
 Matteo Chinellato (born 1991), Italian footballer

Italian-language surnames